Dominic Laurence Johnson (born October 31, 1975) is a St Lucian retired athlete competing in the pole vault. Early in his career he competed in the decathlon.

His personal best result is 5.70 metres, achieved in 2000. This is the current St Lucian record. He also holds the St Lucian records in decathlon, 110 metres hurdles, 4 x 100 metres relay and 4 x 400 metres relay. In 1998, Dominic established his national indoor record of 5.55 m in Flagstaff, Arizona. A graduate of University of Arizona, he has been described by then-coach Dave Murray as "the best all around athlete we've ever had at the university." Dominic, a past Sportsman of the Year recipient in St Lucia, won a silver medal for St Lucia at the 2008 CAC Championships in Cali, Colombia. In collaboration with journalist Terry Finisterre, Dominic also set up a College Athletic Scholarship Program which benefitted more than 30 St. Lucian athletes, one of who went on to become a 2004 Olympian.

Education
Bachelor of Arts and Sciences in anthropology, 1998
University of Arizona, Tucson, Arizona
Three time All-American in track and field
Mary Roby Academic Achievement Award Recipient, multiple times
Three Time NCAA All-American in pole vault and decathlon
The Student Athlete Advisory Board for the University of Arizona
Men's track and field team captain

Competition record

References

External links

1975 births
Living people
Saint Lucian pole vaulters
Arizona Wildcats men's track and field athletes
Athletes (track and field) at the 1996 Summer Olympics
Athletes (track and field) at the 2000 Summer Olympics
Athletes (track and field) at the 2008 Summer Olympics
Olympic athletes of Saint Lucia
Athletes (track and field) at the 1998 Commonwealth Games
Athletes (track and field) at the 2002 Commonwealth Games
Athletes (track and field) at the 2006 Commonwealth Games
Commonwealth Games bronze medallists for Saint Lucia
Commonwealth Games medallists in athletics
Athletes (track and field) at the 1999 Pan American Games
Athletes (track and field) at the 2003 Pan American Games
Athletes (track and field) at the 2007 Pan American Games
Pan American Games bronze medalists for Saint Lucia
Pan American Games medalists in athletics (track and field)
Saint Lucian decathletes
Male pole vaulters
Saint Lucian male athletes
Central American and Caribbean Games gold medalists for Saint Lucia
Competitors at the 2002 Central American and Caribbean Games
Competitors at the 2006 Central American and Caribbean Games
Central American and Caribbean Games medalists in athletics
Medalists at the 2003 Pan American Games
Medallists at the 2002 Commonwealth Games